General Arnold refers to Henry H. Arnold (1886–1950), American who served as General of the Army and General of the Air Force. General Arnold may also refer to:

Abraham Arnold (1837–1901), Union Army brigadier general
Archibald Vincent Arnold (1889–1973), U.S. Army major general
Benedict Arnold (1740–1801), Continental Army major general who became a traitor, and thereafter a British Army brigadier general
Brian A. Arnold (fl. 1970s–2000s), U.S. Air Force lieutenant general
Calvert Hinton Arnold (1894–1963), U.S. Army brigadier general
Lewis Golding Arnold (1817–1871), Union Army brigadier general
Richard Arnold (general) (1828–1882), Union Army brigadier general
Thomas Dickens Arnold (1798–1870), Tennessee Militia brigadier general
William Richard Arnold (bishop) (1881–1965), U.S. Army major general
William Howard Arnold (1901–1976), U.S. Army lieutenant general